Wilhelmsburg station is a rapid transit station on the Harburg S-Bahn line and is served by trains on the Hamburg S-Bahn network. The railway station is located in the quarter Wilhelmsburg in the Hamburg-Mitte borough of the Free and Hanseatic City of Hamburg, Germany.

Wilhelmsburg station is listed as a Bf (Bahnhof) (rail station), a place where trains may start, end or change directions, and that has at least one set of points. The station is managed by DB Station&Service, a subsiary of German railway company Deutsche Bahn AG.

History
The Cöln-Mindener Eisenbahn started its service on the Rollbahn line on December 1, 1872. In 1983 — after 10 years of construction, the first part of Hamburg's southern S-Bahn line from Central Station toward Harburg were completed and opened with the new Wilhelmsburg station.

In connection with Hamburg IBA 2013 (Internationale Bauausstellung), the station was substantially renovated, with a new bridge, entrance and platform roof.

Layout
It has exits on both ends of the island platform and a flat roof.

Services

Trains
S3 and S31 line rapid transit trains call at the station. S3 line trains run through central Hamburg and on to the towns of Pinneberg and Stade.

Facilities at the station
There are no lockers and the station is unstaffed, but there are SOS and information telephones, ticket machines, toilets and a small shop.

Gallery

See also
Hamburger Verkehrsverbund (HVV)
List of Hamburg S-Bahn stations

References

External links

DB station information 
Network plan HVV (pdf) 560 KiB 

Hamburg S-Bahn stations in Hamburg
Buildings and structures in Hamburg-Mitte
Railway stations in Germany opened in 1872